İrfan Başaran  (born 20 December 1989) is a Turkish footballer who plays as a midfielder for İskenderunspor.

İrfan is a product of the Galatasaray Youth Team.

External links

1989 births
Sportspeople from Adana
Living people
Turkish footballers
Turkey youth international footballers
Association football midfielders
Galatasaray S.K. footballers
Beylerbeyi S.K. footballers
Orduspor footballers
Adana Demirspor footballers
Bucaspor footballers
Kahramanmaraşspor footballers
Fethiyespor footballers
Yeni Malatyaspor footballers
Boluspor footballers
Samsunspor footballers
Bandırmaspor footballers
Kocaelispor footballers
İskenderun FK footballers
Süper Lig players
TFF First League players
TFF Second League players
TFF Third League players